Georgie Davis (stage name Kees Rietveld; born 1969 in The Hague, Netherlands) is a Dutch singer, who was one of the first participants of the Soundmixshow in 1985.

Career
David performed a song by Stevie Wonder. Later in the year Davis scored a no. 5 hit in the Netherlands with "Blackstar", which stayed in the Dutch Top 40 chart 12 weeks. His album The Power of the Young reached no. 45 in the Nationale Hitparade Elpee Top 75.

In 2005 David performed in a National Song Contest of the year with a song "Once" written by John Ewbank and managed to pass the preliminary round. 

In 2005, Davis wrote the song "Baby It’s You" for the singer Chastity who reached the fifth place in the Nationaal Songfestival.

In 2010, Davis participated in the Dutch X Factor as Kasy Davis.

Discography
"Blackstar", single 1985
"Human Love", single 1986

References

External links
Georgie Davis performing Blackstar on Youtube

1969 births
Living people
Dutch singer-songwriters